Panicum turgidum  is an old world clumping desert bunchgrass of the genus Panicum. It is a plant of arid regions across Africa and Asia, and has been introduced to other parts of the world.

Description
The stems are long-jointed, hard and polished, with few leaves, resembling bamboo shoots. Side shoots branch out at the nodes, and the stems bend over and root when the nodes get buried. The roots are covered in hairs to which fine sand adheres creating a felted appearance. This is a drought- and salt-tolerant species, and used for flour, fodder, thatch and erosion control.

Distribution and habitat
It is common across the Sahara and Arabia, from Senegal to Pakistan, and known by a number of common names, most widely as Taman,  tuman, or thaman in Egypt and Arabia; merkba or markouba in Mauritania and some Saharan Arabics; and afezu in Tamachek.  Other common names include guinchi (eastern Sahara)  and du-ghasi (Somalia). It grows on sand dunes in hot, dry climates, and will also grow in latosols.

Ecology
In the Nigerien Sahara, tussocks of Panicum turgidum act as a nurse plants for tree regeneration. They have been shown facilitating the regeneration of Acacia tortilis subsp. raddiana by protecting seedlings from drought and domestic herbivory. Accordingly, transplanting seedlings of Saharan trees inside Panicum’s tussocks may promote substantially reforestation in degraded areas on a long-term scale. The leaves and shoots of this grass are palatable to livestock, and camels and donkeys will also eat it in the dry state.

References

p.  261. Board on Science and Technology for International Development, Office of International Affairs, National Research Council. Lost Crops of Africa: Volume I: Grains.  The National Academies of Science, United States. (1996)   .

 Clayton, W.D., Harman, K.T. and Williamson, H. (2006 onwards). GrassBase - The Online World Grass Flora. Panicum turgidum. (accessed 4 January 2009)
Jacob Thomas. Biodiversity of Saudi Arabia: Vegetation. 20-5-2007.
Culmess, Heike. (1997): Investigations on the feeding and migration behavior of the Desert Locust Schistocerca gregaria depending on the vegetation of Mauritania. Project Integrated Biological Control of Grasshoppers and Locusts.  Deutsche Gesellschaft für Technische Zusammenarbeit (GTZ) GmbH.
Fabien Anthelmea, Maman Waziri Matob, Dimitri de Boissieua, Franck Giazzi. (2006). DÉGRADATION DES RESSOURCES VÉGÉTALES AU CONTACT DES ACTIVITÉS HUMAINES ET PERSPECTIVES DE CONSERVATION DANS LE MASSIF DE L'AÏR (SAHARA, NIGER).  VertigO .   VOLUME 7, Numéro 2,  Art. 15.

External links
 

turgidum
Flora of the Arabian Peninsula
Flora of the Indian subcontinent
Flora of North Africa
Flora of Northeast Tropical Africa
Flora of the Republic of the Congo
Flora of West Tropical Africa
Flora of Western Asia
Plants described in 1775